The Indochinese tiger is a population of the Panthera tigris tigris subspecies that is native to Southeast Asia. This population occurs in Myanmar, Thailand, and Laos. In 2011, the population was thought to comprise 342 individuals, including 85 in Myanmar and 20 in Vietnam, with the largest population unit surviving in Thailand estimated at 189 to 252 individuals during 2009 to 2014.

Taxonomy
Vratislav Mazák proposed Panthera tigris corbetti as a scientific name for this specific population in 1968 based on skin colouration, marking pattern and skull dimensions. It was named in honor of Jim Corbett.

In 2017, the Cat Classification Task Force of the Cat Specialist Group revised felid taxonomy and now recognizes the tiger populations of mainland South and Southeast Asia as belonging to the nominate subspecies P. tigris tigris. Results of a genetic study published in 2018 supported six monophyletic clades based on whole genome sequencing analysis of 32 tiger specimens. The specimens from Malaysia and Indochina appeared to be distinct from other mainland Asian populations, thus supporting the concept of six living subspecies.

Characteristics

The Indochinese tiger's ground colouration is darker with more rather short and narrow single stripes; its skull is smaller than that of the Bengal tiger. Eleven Indochinese tiger skins in the collection of the Natural History Museum, London have 21–31 stripes. In body size, it is smaller than Bengal and Siberian tigers.

Distribution and habitat
The Indochinese tiger is distributed in Myanmar, Thailand and Laos. Its historical range also included Cambodia, China and Vietnam. Results of a phylogeographic study using 134 tiger samples across the global range suggest that the historical northwestern distribution limit of the Indochinese tiger is the region in the Chittagong Hill Tracts and Brahmaputra River basin, bordering the range of the Bengal tiger.

In Myanmar, surveys were conducted between 1999 and 2002, confirming the presence of tigers in the Hukawng Valley, Htamanthi Wildlife Sanctuary and in two small areas in the Tanintharyi Region. The Tenasserim Hills is an important area, but forests are harvested there. In 2015, tigers were recorded by camera traps for the first time in the hill forests of Kayin State. Camera trap surveys between 2016 and 2018 revealed about 22 adult individuals in three sites that represent 8% of potential tiger habitat in the country.

More than half of the total Indochinese tiger population survives in the Western Forest Complex in Thailand, especially in the area of the Huai Kha Khaeng Wildlife Sanctuary. This habitat consists of tropical and subtropical moist broadleaf forests. Several individuals had cubs. The population density in Thap Lan National Park, Pang Sida National Park and Dong Yai Wildlife Sanctuary was estimated at 0.32–1.21 individuals per . Three subadult tigers were photographed in spring 2020 in a remote region of Thailand that are thought to be dispersing.

In Laos, 14 tigers were documented in Nam Et-Phou Louey National Protected Area during surveys from 2013 to 2017 covering four blocks of about  semi-evergreen and evergreen forest that are interspersed with some patches of grassland. More recent surveys have failed to detect any tigers, and the likelihood is that they have been extirpated as a result of poaching fueled by demand from China.
 
In eastern Cambodia, tigers were last recorded in Mondulkiri Protected Forest and Virachey National Park during surveys between 1999 and 2007.

From the 1960s and earlier, the Indochinese tiger occurred throughout the mountains in Vietnam, even in the midlands and Islands. In the report of the Government of Vietnam at the Tiger Forum in 2004, there would be tiger only in 17 provinces and they are living in fragmented and severely degraded forest areas. Tigers were still present in 14 protected areas in the 1990s, but none have been recorded in the country since 1997.
Population of tigers in Laos and Vietnam has declined significantly, according to the global census of tigers in 2016, there are only 2 left in Laos and less than 5 in Vietnam only. There is news of its extinction in both countries. In Laos, no tiger has been seen since 2013, when its populations were estimated at only two, and these two individuals simply vanished shortly after 2013 from Nam Et-Phou Louey National Protected Area, denoting they were most likely killed either by snare or gun. In Vietnam, a 2014 IUCN Red List report indicated that tigers possibly extinct in Vietnam.

In China, it occurred historically in Yunnan province and Mêdog County, where it probably does not survive any more today. Thus, probably the Indochinese tiger now only survives in Thailand and Myanmar. In Yunnan's Shangyong Nature Reserve, three individuals were detected during surveys carried out from 2004 to 2009.

Behaviour and ecology
In Thailand's Huai Kha Khaeng Wildlife Sanctuary, seven female and four male tigers were equipped with GPS radio collars between June 2005 and August 2011.

Between 2013 and 2015, 11 prey species were identified at 150 kill sites. Sambar deer, banteng, gaur and wild boar were most frequently killed, but also remains of Asian elephant calves, hog badger, Old World porcupine, muntjac, serow, pangolin and langur species were identified.

Threats
The primary threat to the tiger is poaching for the illegal wildlife trade. Tiger bone has been an ingredient in traditional Chinese medicine for more than 1,500 years and is either added to medicinal wine, used in the form of powder, or boiled to a glue-like consistency. More than 40 different formulae containing tiger bone were produced by at least 226 Chinese companies in 1993. Tiger bone glue is a popular medicine among urban Vietnamese consumers.

Between 2001 and 2010, wildlife markets were surveyed in Myanmar, Thailand and Laos. During 13 surveys, 157 body parts of tigers were found, representing at least 91 individuals. Whole skins were the most commonly traded parts. Bones, paws and penises were offered as aphrodisiacs in places with a large sex industry. Tiger bone wine was offered foremost in shops catering to Chinese customers. Traditional medicine accounted for a large portion of products sold and exported to China, Laos and Vietnam.

Between 2000 and 2011, 641 tigers, both live and dead, were seized in 196 incidents in Thailand, Laos, Vietnam, Cambodia and China; 275 tigers were suspected to have leaked into trade from captive facilities. China was the most common destination of the seized tigers.

Much of the trees have been logged, and the land has been transformed into plantations. Some of the land taken by the Yazana Corporation had been deemed tiger transit corridors. These are areas of land that were supposed to be left untouched by development in order to allow the region's Indochinese tigers to travel between protected pockets of reservation land.

Conservation 

Since 1993, the Indochinese tiger is listed on CITES Appendix I, making international trade illegal. China, South Korea, Vietnam, Singapore and Taiwan banned trade in tigers and sale of medicinal derivatives. Manufacture of tiger-based medicine was banned in China, and the open sale of tiger-based medicine reduced significantly since 1995.

Patrolling in Thailand's Huai Kha Khaeng Wildlife Sanctuary has been intensified since 2006 so that poaching  appears to have reduced, resulting in a marginal improvement of tiger survival and recruitment. By autumn 2016, at least two individuals had dispersed to adjacent Mae Wong National Park; six cubs were observed in Mae Wong and the contiguous Khlong Lan National Park in 2016, indicating that the population was breeding and recovering.

In Thailand and Laos, this tiger is considered Endangered, while it is considered Critically Endangered in Vietnam and Myanmar.

In captivity
The Indochinese tiger is the least represented in captivity and is not part of a coordinated breeding program. As of 2007, 14 individuals were recognized as Indochinese tigers based on genetic analysis of 105 captive tigers in 14 countries.

See also

 Tiger populations
 Mainland Asian populations
 Bengal tiger
 Caspian tiger
 Malayan tiger
 Siberian tiger
 South China tiger
 Sunda island populations
 Bali tiger
 Bornean tiger
 Javan tiger
 Sumatran tiger

 
 Holocene extinction

References

External links

Environment of Southeast Asia
Mammals of China
Mammals of Myanmar
Mammals of Laos
Mammals of Thailand
Indochinese tiger